Peter Hoferica (born 28 June 1983 in Žilina) is a Slovak football midfielder who currently plays for the Slovak 2. liga club MŠK Rimavská Sobota.

References

External links
 at mfkruzomberok.sk 

1983 births
Living people
Sportspeople from Žilina
Slovak footballers
Association football midfielders
FK Dukla Banská Bystrica players
FC Senec players
FC DAC 1904 Dunajská Streda players
MFK Ružomberok players
MŠK Rimavská Sobota players
Slovak Super Liga players